Vnorovy is a municipality and village in Hodonín District in the South Moravian Region of the Czech Republic. It has about 2,900 inhabitants.

Geography
It lies on the border between the Vizovice Highlands and the Lower Morava Valley. The Baťa Canal flows through the municipality.

Administrative parts
The village of Lidéřovice is an administrative part of Vnorovy.

History
The first written mention of Vnorovy is in a hoax which was created between 1267 and 1275. Lidéřovice was first mentioned in 1412. In 1673, Vnorovy was promoted to a market town, but later lost the title. The village and formerly independent municipality of Lidéřovice, which is urbanistically fused with Vnorovy, joined Vnorovy in 1960.

Sights
The landmark of Vnorovy is the Church of Saint Elizabeth. The church was first mentioned in 1378. As it was insufficient for the number of believers, it was demolished in 1908. The new larger building was built in the neo-Baroque style with Art Nouveau elements. It was completed in 1909.

Notable people
Marie Kudeříková (1921–1943), resistance fighter
Jan Skácel (1922–1989), poet

References

External links

Villages in Hodonín District
Moravian Slovakia